Corradino Mineo (born 1 January 1950) is an Italian journalist and politician who served as member of the Italian Senate from 2013 to 2018.

From 2006 to 2013 he was director of the all-news channel RaiNews 24.

References

External links
Files about his parliamentary activities (in Italian): XVII legislature

1950 births
Living people
People from the Province of Trapani
Italian Left politicians
Democratic Party (Italy) politicians
Senators of Legislature XVII of Italy
Italian journalists
Italian male journalists